KMNT (104.3 FM) is a radio station broadcasting a country music format. Licensed to Chehalis, Washington, United States. The station is currently owned by Bicoastal Media Licenses Iv, LLC. It is fully automated 24 hours per day.

References

External links

MNT
Chehalis, Washington